Óðinn Björn Þorsteinsson (born 3 December 1981 in Reykjavík) is an Icelandic athlete competing in the shot put and discus throw. He represented his country at the 2012 Summer Olympics without qualifying for the final.

Competition record

Personal bests
Outdoor
Shot put – 19.83 (Gothenburg 2011)
Discus throw – 60.29 (Kópavogur 2008)
Hammer throw – 48.04 (Hafnarfjördur 2005)
Indoor
Shot put – 20.22 (Hafnarfjördur 2012)

References

1981 births
Living people
Odinn Bjorn Thorsteinsson
Odinn Bjorn Thorsteinsson
Odinn Bjorn Thorsteinsson
Athletes (track and field) at the 2012 Summer Olympics
Odinn Bjorn Thorsteinsson
Icelandic Athletics Championships winners
Olympic male shot putters